Arcadia Valley in Missouri is located 80 miles south of St. Louis in the St. Francois Mountains of the Ozark Plateau.  The valley includes of the towns of Arcadia, Ironton and Pilot Knob, all founded in the 19th century.

Arcadia Valley has been a non-indigenous settlement for over 300 years.  It became a permanent settlement as a mining community, primarily mining iron and lead ore.

Arcadia Valley is known for its red brick Iron County courthouse, graceful antebellum homes and turn-of-the-20th-century mercantile buildings.  It was a popular 19th-century summer resort.  During the Civil War, the valley was the site of a significant battle at Fort Davidson in Pilot Knob.

Elephant Rocks State Park is located in the valley. Johnson's Shut-Ins State Park and Taum Sauk State Park are nearby.

See also
 Lead Belt
 John Wesley Emerson

References

External links
 Arcadia Valley Chamber of Commerce webpage
 Iron County Homestead
 Missouri Mines State Historic Site
 Map of the Mineral resources of Missouri PDF
 Missouri lead mining brochure PDF

Missouri in the American Civil War
Valleys of Iron County, Missouri
Valleys of Missouri